Jiangjun District is a rural district of about 18,745 residents in Tainan, Taiwan. Its Chinese name translates to "general officer".

History 
After the handover of Taiwan from Japan to the Republic of China in 1945, Jiangjun was organized as a rural township of Tainan County. On 25 December 2010, Tainan County was merged with Tainan City and Jiangjun was upgraded to a district of the city.

Geography 
Jiangjun is located on the west coast of Taiwan, and has a harbor and a beach. Its population as of 2016 is 20,286.

Administrative divisions 
Zhangrong, Xihua, Xihe, Zhongxing, Jiachang, Baoyuan, Linghe, Renhe, Beipu, Jiangfu, Jianggui, Sanji, Yushan, Guangshan, Zhangsha, Pingsha, Kunshen and Kunming Village.

Tourist attractions 
 Fangyuan Museum of Arts
 Mashagou Seaside Resort

References

External links 

 

Districts of Tainan